Athletic Club Rodos is a Greek football club based in Rhodes, South Aegean, Greece.

History
Rodos was founded in 1968 after the merger of Diagoras, Rodiakos and Dorieas. Her first participation in a professional championship was in 1969 at the 2nd National. After nine years in 1978, he managed to compete in the first national division. In 1985, while Rhodes split with Diagoras and all of its core body was moved to the national team, the team competed in the Second National and by 1988 had slipped into the 2nd National. In 1994 it re-merged with Diagoras and created the Enosis Rodos-Diagoras. The union lasted only four years and in 1998 the Rhodes team was re-established. The highlight of this new endeavor was the team's involvement in the Second Nationals in the 2009-10 season.

League history
First Division (4): 1978–1980, 1981–1983
Second Division (15): 1968–1978, 1980–1981, 1983–1985, 2009–2010, 2021–2022
Third Division (19): 1985–1988, 1989–1990, 1991–1994, 1995–1997, 2003–2009, 2010–2011, 2016–2018, 2020–2021
Fourth Division (7): 1988–1989, 1990–1991, 1994–1995, 2001–2003, 2011–2012, 2019–2020
Local Championships (8): 1998–2001, 2012–2016, 2018–2019

Honours

Domestic
Leagues:
Second Division   
 Winners (1): 1977–78, 1980–81
Runners-up (4): 1963–64, 1965–66, 1966–67, 1982–83
Third Division   
 Runners-up (2): 2006–07, 2008–09
Fourth Division   
 Winners (4): 1988–89, 1990–91, 2002–03, 2019–20
Dodecanese FCA Championship (Local Championship)   
 Winners (3): 2000–01, 2015–16, 2018–19

Cups:
Dodecanese FCA Cup (Local Cup)   
 Winners (2): 1968–69, 1990–91

Players

Current squad

References

External links
 Official website
 Official website

 
Association football clubs established in 1968
Rhodes (city)
Football clubs in South Aegean
1968 establishments in Greece
Sport in Rhodes
Gamma Ethniki clubs
Super League Greece 2 clubs